The Naval Artillery and Torpedoes Division was a Directorate of the British Admiralty, Naval Staff that was created in June 1918 to decide weapons employment policy and also to develop weapon requirements. This division was also responsible for requirements for ship protection against weapons. It existed until 1920 when its responsibilities were divided into two new directorates, the Gunnery Division and the Torpedo Division.

History
In June 1918 the new Naval Artillery and Torpedoes Division was established in-order to decide weapons employment policy and to develop weapon requirements for the Royal Navy. The division was additionally responsible for requirements for ship protection against weapons. In 1920 the division was split up into new departments the Gunnery Division and the Torpedo Division.

Directors
Post holders included:
 Captain Frederic C. Dreyer: June 1918-February 1919
 Captain John W. L. McClintock: February 1919-April 1920

References

Citations

Sources
 Friedman, Norman (2014). Fighting the Great War at Sea: Strategy, Tactic and Technology. Seaforth Publishing. .
 Mackie, Gordon. "Royal Navy Senior Appointments from 1865" (PDF). gulabin.com. Gordon Mackie, p. 199. December 2017.
 Smith, Gordon. "Royal Navy Organisation and Ship Deployments 1900-1914". www.naval-history.net. Gordon Smith, 8 August 2015.

Admiralty during World War I
Royal Navy
1918 establishments in the United Kingdom
1920 disestablishments in the United Kingdom